Souled Out is a 1995 album by Tower of Power on Epic Records.  It marked the debut of lead vocalist Brent Carter and drummer Herman Matthews, who, coincidentally, is a distant cousin of original TOP vocalist Rick Stevens.  Founding member, baritone saxophone player Stephen "Doc" Kupka graces the front cover of the album.  Jeff Lorber co-produced this album with band leader Emilio Castillo.

Track listing
 "Souled Out" (Castillo, Kupka, Marion McClain) - 3:49
 "Taxed to the Max" (Kupka, Jeff Lorber, Jeff Pescetto) - 4:19
 "Keep Comin' Back" (Lorber, Pescetto) - 3:47
 "Soothe You" (Troy Dexter, Grillo) - 3:52
 "Do You Wanna (Make Love to Me)" (Castillo, Lorber) - 3:51
 "Lovin' You Forever" (McClain) - 4:15
 "Gotta Make a Change" (Danielian, Bob Franceschini, Ozzie Mendelez) - 3:38
 "Diggin' on James Brown" (Castillo, Ken Kessie) - 4:40
 "Sexy Soul" (Castillo) - 4:43
 "Just Like You" (Castillo, Kupka, Pescetto) - 4:27
 "Once You Get a Taste" (Castillo, Kessie, James Wirrick) - 4:01
 "Undercurrent" (Danielian, Mann) - 5:01

Personnel 
Tower of Power
 Brent Carter – lead and backing vocals
 Emilio Castillo – tenor saxophone, backing vocals, lead vocals (8)
 Stephen "Doc" Kupka – baritone saxophone
 David Mann – alto saxophone, tenor saxophone, horn arrangements (1, 5, 8, 9, 10, 12), tenor sax solo (8, 9, 12)
 Bill Churchville – trombone, trumpet, flugelhorn, horn arrangements (2, 3, 4), lead trumpet (2, 3, 4, 6, 9, 11), trumpet solo (7), trombone (11)
 Barry Danielian – trumpet, lead trumpet (1, 5, 7, 8, 10, 12), horn arrangements (1, 5, 7-10, 12), flugelhorn solo (6), trumpet solo (12)
 Nick Milo – keyboards, Hammond B3 organ solo (2), Minimoog solo  (3)
 Carmen Grillo – guitars, guitar solo (11), backing vocals
 Rocco Prestia – bass
 Herman Matthews – drums, percussion, hum-drum (12)

Additional musicians
 Jeff Lorber – clarinet (2, 5), guitars (5)
 Lenny Castro – percussion (3, 4)
 Brandon Fields – saxophone (3, 4)
 Dave Eskridge – horn arrangements (6, 11)
 Bob Franceschini – horn arrangements (7)
 Ozzie Melendez – horn arrangements (7)

Production 
 Emilio Castillo – producer 
 Jeff Lorber – producer (3-6), overdub recording 
 Jeff Pescetto – lead vocal production (2, 5)
 Barry Danielian – co-producer (12)
 David Mann – co-producer (12)
 Ken Kessie – basic track recording
 Alan Meyerson – basic track recording, mixing 
 Richard Bosworth – overdub recording
 Randy Faustino – overdub recording
 Roland Alvarez – assistant engineer
 Trent Slatton – assistant engineer
 Michael Caplan – A&R 
 Maureen Droney – production coordinator 
 Al Masocco – product manager 
 David Coleman – art direction 
 Christine Wilson – design 
 Bret Lopez – photography 
 Mimi DeBlaso – stylist 
 Michelle Zarin – management

Studios
 Recorded at The Complex and Stagg Street Studio (Los Angeles, California); JHL Sound (Pacific Palisades, California): Wings West Recording (Easton, Connecticut).
 Mixed at JHL Sound

In popular culture
On March 12, 2002, The Walt Disney Company and Kids II, Inc.-owned children's video franchise Baby Einstein parodied the track "Diggin' On James Brown" as "I Know My Shapes" written and performed by Jack Moss in the episode Baby Newton: All About Discovering Shapes, as a way of teaching children early math skills.

References

1995 albums
Tower of Power albums
Epic Records albums